Teodoro Matos Santana (22 October 1946 – 12 June 2013) was a Brazilian professional footballer who played as a midfielder.

Career
After previously playing for Ponte Preta, Teodoro made 303 appearances for São Paulo in all competitions, winning the 1977 national title and the 1980 regional title. He later played in the United States for the Dallas Tornado.

Later life and death
Teodoro died on 12 June 2013, at the age of 66, from pancreatic cancer.

References

1946 births
2013 deaths
Brazilian footballers
Brazilian expatriate footballers
Associação Atlética Ponte Preta players
São Paulo FC players
Dallas Tornado players
North American Soccer League (1968–1984) players
Brazilian expatriate sportspeople in the United States
Expatriate soccer players in the United States
Association football midfielders
Deaths from pancreatic cancer
Sportspeople from Santos, São Paulo